Herdsman Lake, also known as Herdsmans Lake, is a freshwater lake located on the Swan Coastal Plain,  north-west of Perth, Western Australia, in the suburb of Herdsman. The main shared use path around the lake is approximately 8 kilometres in length, whilst the wetland perimeter of the lake is approximately 7.5 kilometres.

Description

The lake is encompassed by Herdsman Lake Regional Park. The perimeter of the lake is dredged to provide permanent open water, 15% of the area, during the dry summer months. The lake is a wildlife sanctuary, with birdwatching a popular activity.

Almost 80% of the lake is covered with Typha rush (Typha orientalis), an introduced weed. In summer, most of the lake is dry. 15% of the lake is permanent deep water. In the 1830s, the lake was a possible water supply for Perth. In 1936, the lake was almost used as an alternative airport. Herdsman Lake was declared a regional park in 1999.

The Herdsman Main Drain is a  x  underground pipe drain carrying excess water from the lake to its outflow at City Beach.

Attractions
Attractions within the park include the Olive Seymour Boardwalk, Herdsman Lake Discovery Centre and Settler's Cottage. It also contains a statue created by Pietro Porcelli, which formerly sat atop the now demolished AMP Chambers building, which was rescued and placed on one of the islands. Walking, cycling, picnicking, birdwatching and wildflower spotting are popular activities in the park. Disabled access is provided.

Birds 
More than 160 species of bird have been recorded at Herdsman Lake, including a number of notable sightings and endemic species to the region.

Notable sightings 

 Purple Heron in February 2013, a vagrant to Australia
 Striated Heron in July 2013, vagrant this far south in Western Australia
 Collared Pratincole in January 2019, first found at Point Walter and later relocated at Herdsman Lake, a first record for Australia
 Wandering Whistling-Duck in May 2019, vagrant this far south in Western Australia
 Eastern Yellow Wagtail in January 2020, vagrant this far south in Western Australia

See also

 List of lakes of Western Australia

References

External links

 Herdsman Lake Wildlife Photographs
 Herdsman Lake Wildlife Centre
 Parks and Wildlife Service: Herdsman Lake Regional Park
 Herdsman Lake Regional Park management plan

Lakes of Perth, Western Australia
Remnant urban bushland